The 1540 drought in Europe was a climatic event in Europe. In various palaeoclimatic analyses the temperature and precipitation regimes were reconstructed and compared to present-day conditions.

On the basis of historical records Wetter et al. (2014) derived that during an eleven-month period there was little rain in Europe, possibly qualifying as a megadrought. These conclusions however were questioned by Büntgen et al. (2015) on the basis of additional data (tree rings).

Orth et al. (2016) concluded that in summer 1540 the mean temperature was above the 1966–2015 mean and with a probability of 20% exceeded that of the 2003 summer.

Description 

The Swiss historian Christian Pfister described the events of 1540 in a newspaper interview:

See also 
 2022 European drought

References

Literature

External links 
 
 
  Zeitungsartikel hinter Paywall bzw. in der Print-Ausgabe 3.8.2018 Seite 16
 

Weather events in Europe
1540
History of Central Europe
Droughts in Europe